Nkroful is a village in the Ellembelle District, a district in the Western Region of south Ghana, located near Axim in the Nzema East Municipal of the Western Region.

Geography

Location
Nkroful stands inland 5 km  (3 miles) from the coastal highway, from the Essiama town junction turnoff.

Nkrumah Mausoleum
Nkroful is famous as the birthplace of Kwame Nkrumah. Nkrumah was born there on September 21, 1909, was raised there, and on July 9, 1972, was also buried there after his death. Nkroful has the original Nkrumah Mausoleum and monument, which continues to attract visitors.

The languages spoken in Nkroful are Akan (Nzema) and English.

References

Populated places in the Western Region (Ghana)